The list of Nova Scotia by-elections includes every by-election held in the Canadian province of Nova Scotia. By-elections occur whenever there is a vacancy in the House of Assembly, although an imminent general election may allow the vacancy to remain until the dissolution of parliament. Between 1840 and 1927 incumbent members were required to recontest their seats upon being appointed to Cabinet. These Ministerial by-elections were almost always uncontested.

63rd General Assembly of Nova Scotia 2017–2021

62nd General Assembly of Nova Scotia 2013–2017

61st General Assembly of Nova Scotia 2009–2013

60th General Assembly of Nova Scotia 2006–2009

59th General Assembly of Nova Scotia 2003–2006

58th General Assembly of Nova Scotia 1999–2003

57th General Assembly of Nova Scotia 1998–1999
no by-elections

56th General Assembly of Nova Scotia 1993–1998

55th General Assembly of Nova Scotia 1988–1993

54th General Assembly of Nova Scotia 1984–1988

53rd General Assembly of Nova Scotia 1981–1984

52nd General Assembly of Nova Scotia 1978–1981

51st General Assembly of Nova Scotia 1974–1978

50th General Assembly of Nova Scotia 1970–1974

49th General Assembly of Nova Scotia 1967–1970

48th General Assembly of Nova Scotia 1963–1967
no by-elections

47th General Assembly of Nova Scotia 1960–1963

46th General Assembly of Nova Scotia 1956–1960

45th General Assembly of Nova Scotia 1953–1956

44th General Assembly of Nova Scotia 1949–1953

43rd General Assembly of Nova Scotia 1945–1949
no by-elections

42nd General Assembly of Nova Scotia 1941–1945

† Won by acclamation

41st General Assembly of Nova Scotia 1937–1941

† Won by acclamation

40th General Assembly of Nova Scotia 1933–1937

39th General Assembly of Nova Scotia 1928–1933

38th General Assembly of Nova Scotia 1925–1928

† Won by acclamation

37th General Assembly of Nova Scotia 1920–1925

† Won by acclamation

36th General Assembly of Nova Scotia 1916–1920

† Won by acclamation

35th General Assembly of Nova Scotia 1911–1916

† Won by acclamation

34th General Assembly of Nova Scotia 1906–1911

† Won by acclamation

33rd General Assembly of Nova Scotia 1901–1906

† Won by acclamation

32nd General Assembly of Nova Scotia 1897–1901

† Won by acclamation

31st General Assembly of Nova Scotia 1894–1897

† Won by acclamation

30th General Assembly of Nova Scotia 1890–1894

29th General Assembly of Nova Scotia 1886–1890

† Won by acclamation

28th General Assembly of Nova Scotia 1882–1886

† Won by acclamation

27th General Assembly of Nova Scotia 1878–1882

† Won by acclamation

26th General Assembly of Nova Scotia 1874–1878

† Won by acclamation

25th General Assembly of Nova Scotia 1871–1874

† Won by acclamation

24th General Assembly of Nova Scotia 1867–1871

† Won by acclamation

23rd General Assembly of Nova Scotia 1863–1867

22nd General Assembly of Nova Scotia 1859–1863

20th General Assembly of Nova Scotia 1855–1859

19th General Assembly of Nova Scotia 1851–1855

18th General Assembly of Nova Scotia 1847–1851

17th General Assembly of Nova Scotia 1843–1847

16th General Assembly of Nova Scotia 1840–1843

15th General Assembly of Nova Scotia 1836–1840

14th General Assembly of Nova Scotia 1830–1836

13th General Assembly of Nova Scotia 1826–1830

12th General Assembly of Nova Scotia 1820–1826

11th General Assembly of Nova Scotia 1818–1820

10th General Assembly of Nova Scotia 1811–1818

9th General Assembly of Nova Scotia 1806–1811

8th General Assembly of Nova Scotia 1799–1806

7th General Assembly of Nova Scotia 1793–1799

6th General Assembly of Nova Scotia 1785–1793

5th General Assembly of Nova Scotia 1770–1785

4th General Assembly of Nova Scotia 1765–1770

3rd General Assembly of Nova Scotia 1761–1765

2nd General Assembly of Nova Scotia 1759–1760
no by-elections

1st General Assembly of Nova Scotia 1758–1759

See also
 List of federal by-elections in Canada

Notes

References
 
 The Legislative Assembly of Nova Scotia 1758 -1983 : a biographical directory

By-elections
Provincial by-elections in Nova Scotia
Elections, by-elections
Nova Scotia, by-ele